Walter August Voigt (July 2, 1895 – June 26, 1937) was an American football player who played two seasons in the American Professional Football Association for the Chicago Tigers, Hammond Pros and Chicago Cardinals.

References

1895 births
1937 deaths
American football guards
American football centers
Chicago Tigers players
Hammond Pros players
Chicago Cardinals players
Players of American football from Illinois
Sportspeople from Oak Park, Illinois